Fatehpur Shekhawati railway station is a railway station in Sikar district, Rajasthan. Its code is FPS. It serves Fatehpur city.

Line and location 
Fatehpur Shekhawati comes within the territory of the North Western Railway located on Churu–Sikar–Jaipur

References

External links

Railway junction stations in Rajasthan
Railway stations in Sikar district
Jaipur railway division